Jet Generation is the sixth studio album by Japanese rock band Guitar Wolf. It was released in Japan on 21 January 1999 and in the U.S. on 22 June 1999.

The album is labeled with a disclaimer sticker that semi-humorously states, "Warning: this is the loudest album ever recorded. Playing at normal volume may cause irreparable damage to stereo equipment. Use at your own risk". It includes a cover of Eddie Cochran's "Summertime Blues".

Critical reception
Exclaim! wrote that "while so many other great bands dry up or go soft over time, it's great to hear Guitar Wolf pounding it out like it's still their first rehearsal". The Village Voice declared that "Guitar Wolf are a regular (albeit mildly psychotic) guitar-bass-drums rock band, who excel at the most primal sort of no-frills trash-rock". CMJ New Music Report deemed the album "raw, rebellious and sonically nihilistic".

Track listing
 "Jet Generation"
 "Fujiyama Attack"
 "Kaminari One" (Jet Version) (Thunder/Lightning One)
 "Kung Fu Ramone"
 "Teenage U.F.O."
 "Cosmic Space Girl"
 "Roaring Blood"
 "Gakulan Rider" (Schoolboy Rider)
 "Refrigerator Zero"
 "Shimane Slim"
 "Cyborg Kids"
 "Summertime Blues"
 "Can"-Nana Fever (Jet Version)

References

1999 albums
Guitar Wolf albums
Ki/oon Records albums
Matador Records albums